Shah Faiz Public School is a Senior Secondary school in Ghazipur City, Uttar Pradesh, India founded by Late Mrs. Saeeda Faiz on 18 July 1985.

Affiliation Status 
The School is Affiliated to C.B.S.E., New Delhi. Affiliation Code 2130381

References 

High schools and secondary schools in Uttar Pradesh
Education in Ghazipur district
Ghazipur
Educational institutions established in 1985
1985 establishments in Uttar Pradesh